Transpecos is a 2016 American thriller film directed by Greg Kwedar, and written by Kwedar and Clint Bentley. The film stars Johnny Simmons, Gabriel Luna, and Clifton Collins, Jr. as border patrol agents who encounter a Mexican drug cartel. The film premiered at South by Southwest on March 13, 2016. The film was released on September 9, 2016, in a limited release and through video on demand by Samuel Goldwyn Films.

Cast
 Johnny Simmons as Benjamin Davis
 Gabriel Luna as Lance Flores
 Clifton Collins, Jr. as Lou Hobbs
 Will Brittain as Agent Hendricks
 Alma Martinez as Marisa

Release
Transpecos received its world premiere at South by Southwest in Austin, Texas on March 13, 2016. Shortly after, Samuel Goldwyn Films acquired U.S distribution rights to the film, with a planned fall release.

Reception
The film was met with positive reviews from critics. John DeFore of The Hollywood Reporter wrote: "Artfully made but wholly accessible for a mainstream audience, it features strong performances but no names in the cast who'll draw attention on their own." DeFore went on to single out the performance of Gabriel Luna, writing: "While all three performances are on target, the film belongs to Luna, as Flores scrambles to mislead the bosses he wants to alert until he and Davis can somehow fix this botched smuggling run." Kahron Spearman of The Austin Chronicle wrote: "With nail-biting precision, Kwedar has crafted Transpecos into a diamond."

References

External links
 
 
 

2016 films
2016 thriller films
American thriller films
American independent films
Films shot in New Mexico
Samuel Goldwyn Films films
2016 independent films
2010s American films